The 1952–53 LSU Tigers basketball team represented Louisiana State University as a member of the Southeastern Conference during the 1952–53 NCAA men's basketball season. The head coach was Harry Rabenhorst, and the team played their home games at Huey P. Long Field House in Baton Rouge, Louisiana.

The Tigers swept through the SEC regular season and followed that success by reaching the first Final Four appearance in school history. The team finished with a record of 22–3 (13–0 SEC).

Roster

Schedule and results

|-
!colspan=9 style=| Regular Season

|-
!colspan=9 style=| NCAA Tournament

Rankings

Awards and honors
Bob Pettit – Consensus Second-Team All-American

References

LSU Tigers basketball seasons
Lsu
NCAA Division I men's basketball tournament Final Four seasons
Lsu
LSU
LSU